Jean-Dénis Wanga-Edingue (born 12 April 1975) is a retired Cameroonian football player.

Wanga spent most of his career in Greece and played for Panelefsiniakos, Egaleo and Kallithea in the Greek Alpha Ethniki. He also had a brief spell in Chile with Coquimbo Unido during 2000.

Wanga made one appearance for the Cameroon national football team in a 1994 friendly tournament.

See also
Football in Cameroon
List of football clubs in Cameroon

References

1975 births
Living people
Cameroonian footballers
Cameroonian expatriate footballers
Cameroon international footballers
Egaleo F.C. players
Kalamata F.C. players
Kallithea F.C. players
Coquimbo Unido footballers
Chilean Primera División players
Expatriate footballers in Chile
Expatriate footballers in Greece
Cameroonian expatriate sportspeople in Chile
Cameroonian expatriate sportspeople in Greece
Panelefsiniakos F.C. players
Association football midfielders